Stefan Brits (born 19 January 1992) is a South African track and field athlete who competes in the long jump. Brits represented his country at the 2016 Summer Olympics.

Career 
Born in Cape Town, he attended Paul Roos Gymnasium. Brits competed in the long jump from a young age and was twice a participant at both the World Youth Championships in Athletics (2007, 2009) and the World Junior Championships in Athletics (2008, 2010). He was a silver medallist in the long jump at the 2009 World Youth Championships in Athletics and took gold at the 2008 Commonwealth Youth Games.

Brits enrolled at Florida State University as a chemistry doctoral student and was unusual as a post-graduate in that he also competed as a student-athlete for the Florida State Seminoles track team. In his first major college meet, he was runner-up at the 2012 Atlantic Coast Conference (ACC) indoor championship and was 20th at the NCAA Men's Division I Outdoor Track and Field Championships later that year.

He missed much of 2014 and 2015 due to an injury but returned to ACC and NCAA competition in mid-2015. He qualified for the NCAA Outdoor Championships, but did not compete due to an injury. Brits performed well academically during his college athletic career and was a four-time Academic All-American. This culminated with him being named the 2016 Academic All-American of the Year by the College Sports Information Directors of America, making him the second Florida State athlete ever to receive that honour, after shot putter and Rhodes Scholar  Garrett Johnson.

His jump of 8.22 m earned him selection for South Africa at the 2016 Summer Olympics, where he competed in the qualifying round only.

Personal bests
100 metres – 10.88 (2010)
200 metres – 21.31 (2008)
Long jump – 8.22 m (2016)
Indoor – 7.82 m (2016)

International competitions

References

External links

Living people
1992 births
Sportspeople from Cape Town
South African male long jumpers
Olympic athletes of South Africa
Athletes (track and field) at the 2016 Summer Olympics
Florida State Seminoles men's track and field athletes
20th-century South African people
21st-century South African people